Tedros Redae (born 12 August 1991) is an Ethiopian cyclist.

Major results
2017
1st Overall Tour Ethiopian Meles Zenawi
1st Stage 4

References

1991 births
Living people
Ethiopian male cyclists
21st-century Ethiopian people